Paolo Fontanelli (born 5 July 1953 in Santa Maria a Monte) is an Italian politician.

He was a member of the Democratic Party from 2007 until 2017, when he joined Article One.

Fontanelli was elected Mayor of Pisa on 14 December 1998 and re-elected for a second term on 27 May 2003.

He was elected at the 2008 Italian general election, serving as member of the Chamber of Deputies for two legislatures (XVI, XVII).

See also
2008 Italian general election
2013 Italian general election
List of mayors of Pisa

References

External links
 
 

1953 births
Living people
Mayors of Pisa
Article One (political party) politicians
Democratic Party (Italy) politicians
Democrats of the Left politicians
Democratic Party of the Left politicians
Italian Communist Party politicians